Butmas, also Butmas-Tur or Farafi, is a language of the interior of Santo Island in Vanuatu.

References

Languages of Vanuatu
Espiritu Santo languages